Triphenyl phosphite is the organophosphorus compound with the formula P(OC6H5)3. It is a colourless viscous liquid.

Preparation
Triphenylphosphite is prepared from phosphorus trichloride and phenol in the presence of a catalytic amount of base:
PCl3 + 3 HOC6H5  →  P(OC6H5)3 + 3 HCl

Reactions
Triphenylphosphite is a precursor to trimethylphosphine, it serves as a source of P3+ that is less electrophilic than phosphorus trichloride:
 (C6H5O)3P  +  3CH3MgBr  → P(CH3)3 + 3"MgBrOC6H5"

Triphenylphosphite is quaternized by methyl iodide:
 (C6H5O)3P + CH3I → [CH3(C6H5O)3P]+I−

Coordination complexes
Triphenylphosphite is a common ligand in coordination chemistry. It forms zero-valent complexes of the type M[P(OC6H5)3]4 (M = Ni, Pd, Pt). The nickel complex can be prepared by displacement of the diene from bis(cyclooctadiene)nickel:
 Ni(COD)2 + 4 P(OC6H5)3 → Ni[P(OC6H5)3]4 + 2 COD
Related complexes are homogeneous catalysts for the hydrocyanation of alkenes. It also forms a variety of Fe(0) and Fe(II) complexes such as the dihydride H2Fe[P(OC6H5)3]4.

Polyamorphism
Triphenylphosphite is a notable example of polyamorphism in organic compounds, namely it exists in two different amorphous forms at temperatures about 200 K. One polymorphic modification of triphenyl phosphite was obtained by means of crystallization in ionic liquids.

References

Phenol ethers
Organophosphites